Lamourie Lock is located near Lecompte, Louisiana. It functioned as a control lock rather than a traditional  navigational lock, keeping water from flowing from Bayou Boeuf to Bayou Lamourie, maintaining the water level in the prior.  It was added to the National Register of Historic Places on October 14, 1994.

See also
 Historic preservation
 National Register of Historic Places listings in Rapides Parish, Louisiana

References

External links 
 
 

Buildings and structures in Rapides Parish, Louisiana
National Register of Historic Places in Rapides Parish, Louisiana
Locks on the National Register of Historic Places in Louisiana